The 2003 World Weightlifting Championships were held in Vancouver, Canada from 14 November to 22 November. The women's +75 kilograms division was staged on 20 and 21 November 2003.

Schedule

Medalists

Records

Results

New records

References
Weightlifting World Championships Seniors Statistics, Page 46 
Results 

2003 World Weightlifting Championships
World